Roberto Fernando Schneiger (born 13 April 1963), known as Roberto Cavalo, is a Brazilian professional football manager and former player who played as a defensive midfielder.

Career as a player
Born in Carazinho, Roberto Cavalo began his career with Atlético Paranaense, with whom he made his debut in the top Division against Criciúma and in 1991 he was part of the squad won the 1991 Copa do Brasil. He then Vitória in the Campeonato Brasileiro Série A, it was a positive season: seven goals in twenty-three matches earned him inclusion in the League best eleven (Bola de Prata). During that same season he also played two final tournament, lost to Botafogo. Transferred to Sport and Avaí, where he finished his career in 1997.

Career as a manager
Since 1998 he coached the Avaí. Already in 2004, brilliant fez campaign in the Campeonato Brasileiro Série B having been one of four finalists (it ended at a third honorable place).

Then it assumed several teams in Brazil like Joinville, Chapecoense, Gama, Paysandu, Naútico, Criciúma, America de Natal and Bahia. On 11 September 2009, it was announced like new commander of the Paraná. some months later it was announced like new technician of the Mixto for the season 2010. it trained still Town Nov, disputing the Série B. Again it returned to Paraná and to Town in November. In 2012 it assumed the West and Grêmio Barueri. and 2013, put his return right to the West. In 2014 it was announced like new trainer of the Atlético Sorocaba not lasting very much in the post was dismissed in the same year and in the same year, it put his third passage right to the West to dispute the remainder of the Série B and being in 2015 up to the moment disputing of Campeonato Paulista Série A2 in 2015.

Honours

Player 
 Atlético-PR
 Campeonato Paranaense: 1988

 Criciúma
 Campeonato Catarinense: 1991
 Copa do Brasil: 1991
 Bola de Prata Placar 1993 - Volante (Vitória-BA)

Manager
 Avaí
 Campeonato Brasileiro Série C: 1998

Paysandu
 Campeonato Paraense: 2005

References

External links

1963 births
Living people
Sportspeople from Rio Grande do Sul
Association football defenders
Brazilian footballers
Brazilian football managers
Campeonato Brasileiro Série A players
Campeonato Brasileiro Série B players
Campeonato Brasileiro Série B managers
Club Athletico Paranaense players
Criciúma Esporte Clube players
Esporte Clube Vitória players
Botafogo de Futebol e Regatas players
Sport Club do Recife players
Avaí FC players
Avaí FC managers
Associação Atlética Anapolina managers
Joinville Esporte Clube managers
Sociedade Esportiva e Recreativa Caxias do Sul managers
União São João Esporte Clube managers
Associação Chapecoense de Futebol managers
Sociedade Esportiva do Gama managers
União Agrícola Barbarense Futebol Clube managers
Paysandu Sport Club managers
Clube Náutico Capibaribe managers
Esporte Clube Santo André managers
Clube de Regatas Brasil managers
Marília Atlético Clube managers
Criciúma Esporte Clube managers
América Futebol Clube (RN) managers
Esporte Clube Bahia managers
Associação Desportiva Confiança managers
Mixto Esporte Clube managers
Paraná Clube managers
Vila Nova Futebol Clube managers
Oeste Futebol Clube managers
Clube Atlético Bragantino managers
Grêmio Barueri Futebol managers
Clube Atlético Sorocaba managers
Botafogo Futebol Clube (SP) managers